The Serbian Left (ЛС / Levica Srbije, LS) was a minor centre-left social democratic political party in Serbia. In April 2019 the Serbian Left merged into Dragan Đilas's Party of Freedom and Justice (SSP).

History
The Serbian Left was founded by Borko Stefanović as a splinter from the Democratic Party.

In the 2017 Serbian presidential election, the Serbian Left supported "either Janković or Jeremić".

An attack on its leader Stefanović in late 2018 was instrumental in kicking off major protests around the country.

It merged into the center-left Party of Freedom and Justice formed by former Mayor of Belgrade Dragan Đilas in April 2019.

Electoral results

Parliamentary elections

References

2015 establishments in Serbia
2019 disestablishments in Serbia
Defunct political parties in Serbia
Political parties disestablished in 2015
Political parties established in 2015
Pro-European political parties in Serbia
Social democratic parties in Serbia
Social liberal parties
Political parties disestablished in 2019
Democratic Party (Serbia) breakaway groups